Kostadin Yanchev (born 19 March 1963) is a former Bulgarian footballer who played at both professional and international levels as a midfielder. He earned 16 caps for the Bulgarian national side between 1983 and 1989.

Career
Born in Blagoevgrad, Yanchev started his career at hometown club Pirin Blagoevgrad before transferring to CSKA Sofia in June 1984.

Yanchev spent six and a half seasons with CSKA, where he won three A Group titles, four Bulgarian Cups and one Bulgarian Supercup. He played 159 league matches for the club, scoring 13 goals.

In early 1991, Yanchev joined Spanish side Las Palmas. After leaving Las Palmas in January 1993, he joined Yantra Gabrovo. He spent six months with Montana, before finishing his career with CSKA in 1994.

References

External links
Profile at FootballDatabase.eu

1963 births
Living people
Bulgarian footballers
Bulgaria international footballers
OFC Pirin Blagoevgrad players
PFC CSKA Sofia players
UD Las Palmas players
FC Yantra Gabrovo players
FC Montana players
First Professional Football League (Bulgaria) players
Association football midfielders
Sportspeople from Blagoevgrad